Beaudoin Peak is a snow-free peak,  high, surmounting the southeast part of the Meyer Hills in the Heritage Range. It was mapped by the United States Geological Survey from surveys and from U.S. Navy air photos, 1961–66, and named by the Advisory Committee on Antarctic Names for Douglas W. Beaudoin, United States Antarctic Research Program meteorologist at Ellsworth Station, 1961.

See also
 Mountains in Antarctica

References
 

Mountains of Ellsworth Land